Jhoom is the third album of Pakistani pop singer Ali Zafar, released in 2011 by YRF Music in India, Pakistan and worldwide. It contains Sufi-pop music, remastered in Abbey Road Studios. The album topped the music charts in Pakistan, as well as in India for several weeks after its release.

Track listing

Personnels

Awards and nominations
2012 Lux Style Award for "Best Album"
 2011 Mirchi Music Awards for Indie Pop Song of the Year – Nominated

Featured in other media
Earlier from the release of album, Ali Zafar joined Coke Studio Pakistan, and performed "Allah Hu" along with Saaein Tufail Ahmed in season 1, 2008, and "Dastan-e-Ishq"; "Yar Daddi" and "Nahi Ray Nahi" in season 2, 2009; one of which was also featured as OST for a 2011 TV series on A-Plus TV.

In May 2022, "Jhoom" (R&B Mix) went viral on social media, with several Indian celebrities making Instagram reels and cover versions, after which Zafar released a compilation music video on 29 May 2022.

Music videos
"Allah Hu" (Coke Studio)
"Dastan-e-Ishq" (Coke Studio)
"Yar Dhadhi Ishq" (Coke Studio)
"Nahin Ray Nahin" (Coke Studio)
"Jhoom"
"Jee Dhoondta Hai"
"Dastan-e-Ishq" (Main Mar Gai Shaukat Ali)
"Jhoom" (R&B Mix)

See also
Ali Zafar discography
Huqa Pani
Total Siyapaa
Teefa in Trouble

References

External links
Jhoom Audio Jukebox on YouTube

Buy Jhoom on Taazi

2011 albums
Ali Zafar albums